Azerbaijan National Agency for Mine Action (ANAMA) is a mine action agency and executive body under State Commission for Reconstruction and Rehabilitation of War-Affected Areas of the Republic of Azerbaijan. The agency is accountable for implementing all necessary procedures corresponding to Azerbaijan Mine Action Program in order to decontaminate mines within the territory of Azerbaijan. Donors of the agency are government of Azerbaijan ($2,400, 000) and UNDP ($160,000).

History 

ANAMA was founded on the basis of the Presidential Decree No.854 dated July 18, 1998. The Agency is considered as a joint project of the Government of Azerbaijan and UNDP according to a bilateral agreement which was signed on April 2, 1999.  Since the establishment of the Agency more than 40 thousand hectares of the territory of the Republic of Azerbaijan have been cleared according to the statistics of 2017. 796,754 unexploded mines and ordnance were found and eliminated.

Objectives 
ANAMA within its authority tries to create such environment that the citizens of the Republic of Azerbaijan could no longer suffer from landmines and explosive devices. In order to achieve this aim, the Agency attempt to increase its demining capacity. Therefore, it is improving its Information Technology capacity to promote the research-development process related to mine action activities in Azerbaijan. Additionally, the head office pursues the certain policies that tend to reduce the number of fatal accidents and injuries occurred due to explosions of mine, to restore and reconstruct the infrastructure and to ensure food safety. It is expected that as a result of these measures the IDPs (internally displaced persons as a consequences of NK conflict) could return to their homeland again. Mine Risk Education Program that suggested by ANAMA is one of the Agency's strategic objectives that determines rules and regulations in order to increase awareness about the possible dangers that can occur as a result of explosion of mine among the local population who lives under threat of the mentioned dangerous situation. The education program of the Agency is implemented in more than 25 regions and especially the areas close to front lines.

Structure 
The structure of ANAMA comprises headquarters in Baku city, the local branches that are located in Horadiz settlement, Fizuli and Goygol districts and additionally, four operational centers located in Terter, Agjabedi, Agstafa and Baku.

International cooperations 
ANAMA has been collaborating with several international organizations such as International Trust Fund for Demining and Mine Victims Assistance (ITF), Geneva International Centre for Humanitarian Demining. The Agency also cooperating with the relevant state organizations of Croatia and Slovenia (Slovenian International Trust Fund for Demining and Mine Victim Assistance). On January 25, 2013, ANAMA signed another agreement with International Organization for Migration. Additionally, the Agency cooperating with UNDP (United Nations Development Programme) since 1999.

References

External links 
 Official website

Government agencies of Azerbaijan
1998 establishments in Azerbaijan
Mine warfare and mine clearance organizations